The Railway Stories are a series of audio adaptations of The Railway Series books by the Rev. W Awdry and his son Christopher.

Nearly all of the 42 books in the series have been recorded by one of five different narrators: Johnny Morris, William Rushton, Ted Robbins, Michael Angelis, and even the Rev. W. Awdry himself.

Rev. W. Awdry recordings

The first known audio adaptation was a 7" (33⅓rpm) EP narrated by the Rev. W. Awdry himself (see photo), with "background effects taken from real engines".

This record, released in 1957 by Chiltern Records of Princes Risborough, contained two stories – Edward's Day Out and Edward and Gordon – from the first book in the Railway Series: The Three Railway Engines.

Johnny Morris recordings (Delysé)
The first widely available recordings were narrated by Johnny Morris and released in the early 1960s by the Delysé Recording Company.  Each 7" (45rpm) vinyl record contained two stories, taken from the first eleven books of The Railway Series.  The recordings were released in mono.

The front of the record sleeve showed an original illustration from the story in the original book.  While on the back, there was a list of the other recordings in "The Railway Engine Series" [sic], together with an introduction from the Rev. W. Awdry:

The label on the record was also quite distinctive, showing a smiling red engine on a blue/white background. The label was carefully designed so that the record player spindle fitted through the engine's 'nose'!  No attempt had been made to make the engine look like one of those from the stories.

Record Details
Stories from Book 1 - The Three Railway Engines:
DEL101 (196x) - 1. Edward's Day Out, 2. Edward and Gordon
DEL102 (196x) - 1. The Sad Story of Henry, 2. Edward, Gordon and Henry

Stories from Book 2 - Thomas the Tank Engine:
DEL103 (1961) - 1. Thomas and Gordon, 2. Thomas's Train
DEL104 (196x) - 1. Thomas and the Trucks, 2. Thomas and the Breakdown Train

Stories from Book 3 - James the Red Engine:
DEL114 (196x) - 1. James and the Top Hat, 2. James and the Bootlace
DEL115 (196x) - 1. Troublesome Trucks, 2. James and the Express

Stories from Book 4 - Tank Engine Thomas Again:
DEL137 (1964) - 1. Thomas and the Guard, 2. Thomas Goes Fishing
DEL138 (196x) - 1. Thomas, Terence and the Snow, 2. Thomas and Bertie

Stories from Book 5 - Troublesome Engines:
DEL142 (196x) - 1. Henry and the Elephant, 2. Tenders and Turntables
DEL143 (196x) - 1. Trouble in the Shed, 2. Percy Runs Away

Stories from Book 6 - Henry the Green Engine:
DEL150 (196x) - 1. Coal, 2. The Flying Kipper
DEL151 (1966) - 1. Gordon's Whistle, 2. Henry's Sneeze

Stories from Book 7 - Toby the Tram Engine:
DEL152 (196x) - 1. Toby and the Stout Gentleman, 2. Thomas in Trouble
DEL153 (196x) - 1. Dirty Objects, 2. Mrs Kindley's Christmas

Stories from Book 8 - Gordon the Big Engine:
DEL154 (196x) - 1. Off the Rails, 2. Leaves
DEL155 (1966) - 1. Down the Mine, 2. Paint Pots and Queens

Stories from Book 9 - Edward the Blue Engine:
DEL212 (196x) - 1. Cows!, 2. Berties' Chase
DEL213 (196x) - 1. Saved from Scrap, 2. Old Iron

Stories from Book 10 - Four Little Engines:
DEL214 (196x) - 1. Skarloey Remembers, 2. Sir Handel
DEL215 (196x) - 1. Peter, Sam and the Refreshment Lady, 2. Old Faithful

Stories from Book 11 - Percy the Small Engine:
DEL216 (196x) - 1. Percy and the Signal, 2. Duck Takes Charge
DEL217 (196x) - 1. Percy and Harold, 2. Percy's Promise

Decca and Argo recordings
In the 1970s the stories were released on 12" (33⅓rpm) vinyl albums by Decca Records as part of their "World of Children's Stories" series.  Each record contained the stories from two complete books, one book on each side. The sleeve notes included the same quote from Rev. W. Awdry (see Delysé recordings, above). The sleeve illustrations were taken directly from the artwork of the original books.

The first eight books were again narrated by Johnny Morris. The original Delysé recordings were re-used.

Decca was also the owner of the Argo label, renowned for its audiobooks and other non-music recordings. It was therefore a natural progression to extend the series on this label. New recordings were made for six further books from The Railway Series, starting with Edward the Blue Engine.  These stories were narrated by Willie Rushton and the gaps between the tracks included atmospheric (if not always accurate) steam or diesel sound effects.

The albums were later released on audio cassette under the same labels. Recordings were produced by Peter Johnson ('Peter John Productions'); with Kaye & Ward Ltd and Third Man Music being identified as owners of the works.

Subsequently, Willie Rushton also recorded the remaining books (up to no. 26 Tramway Engines) on the Argo label.  These recordings were never released on vinyl, only on audio cassette.

List of recordings

Individual books
The Johnny Morris albums were identified as 'Volume 1' to 'Volume 4'; while the Willie Rushton recordings omitted any 'Volume' identity on the front cover.  For clarity, the recording details below have been identified by volume numbers, regardless of whether these were shown on the sleeve.

Volume 1: DECCA MONO LP - PA 270 (1972), Cassette - KCPA 270 (19??)
Narrator: Johnny Morris

Side 1 (from Book 1: The Three Railway Engines)
 Edward's Day Out
 Edward and Gordon
 The Sad Story of Henry
 Edward, Gordon and Henry

Side 2 (from Book 2: Thomas the Tank Engine)
 Thomas and Gordon
 Thomas's Train
 Thomas and the Trucks
 Thomas and the Breakdown Train

Volume 2: DECCA MONO LP - PA 271 (1972), Cassette - KCPA 271 (19??)
Narrator: Johnny Morris

Side 1 (from Book 3: James the Red Engine)
 James and the Top Hat
 James and the Bootlace
 Troublesome Trucks
 James and the Express

Side 2 (from Book 4: Tank Engine Thomas Again)
 Thomas and the Guard
 Thomas Goes Fishing
 Thomas, Terence and the Snow
 Thomas and Bertie

Volume 3: DECCA MONO LP - PA 272 (1972), Cassette - KCPA 272 (19??)
Narrator: Johnny Morris

Side 1 (from Book 5: Troublesome Engines)
 Henry and the Elephant
 Tenders and Turntables
 Trouble in the Shed
 Percy Runs Away

Side 2 (from Book 6: Henry the Green Engine)
 Coal
 The Flying Kipper
 Gordon’s Whistle
 Henry’s Sneeze
(The book Henry the Green Engine was unique in the series by having five stories rather than four.For the recording, it was the fourth story "Percy and the Trousers" which was omitted.)

Volume 4: DECCA MONO LP - PA 273 (1972), Cassette - KCPA 273 (19??)
Narrator: Johnny Morris

Side 1 (from Book 7: Toby the Tram Engine)
 Toby and the Stout Gentleman
 Thomas in Trouble
 Dirty Objects
 Mrs Kindley's Christmas

Side 2 (from Book 8: Gordon the Big Engine)
 Off the Rails
 Leaves
 Down the Mine
 Paint Pots and Queens

Volume 5: ARGO STEREO LP - SPA 559 (1979) Cassette - KCSP 559 (1979)
Narrator: William Rushton

Side 1 (from Book 9: Edward the Blue Engine)
 Cows
 Bertie's Chase
 Saved from Scrap
 Old Iron

Side 2 (from Book 10: Four Little Engines)
 Skarloey Remembers
 Sir Handel
 Peter Sam & The Refreshment Lady
 Old Faithful

Volume 6: ARGO STEREO LP - SPA 560 (1979), Cassette - KCSP 560 (1979)
Narrator: William Rushton

Side 1 (from Book 11: Percy the Small Engine)
Percy and the Signal
Duck Takes Charge
Percy and Harold
Percy’s Promise
 
Side 2 (from Book 12: The Eight Famous Engines) 
Percy Takes the Plunge
Gordon Goes Foreign
Double Header
The Fat Controller’s Engines

Volume 7: ARGO STEREO LP - SPA 561 (1979), Cassette - KCSP 561 (1979)
Narrator: William Rushton

Side 1 (from Book 13: Duck and the Diesel Engine) 
Domeless Engines
Pop Goes The Diesel
Dirty Work
A Close Shave

Side 2 (from Book 14: The Little Old Engine)
Trucks
Home At Last
Rock 'n' Roll
Little Old Twins

The case insert for the cassette version lists the story titles as being on 'Side 1' and 'Side 2', but the labels on the cassette itself are marked '5' and '6'. By comparison, the label on cassette KCSP 559 identifies the sides conventionally ('1' and '2').

Compilations
In addition to the individual releases, the recordings were re-released together as compilations on the Argo label.  The first compilations were released on two pairs of individually cased cassettes: one pair for the Johnny Morris stories, one pair for Willie Rushton's.

The Willie Rushton compilation was released again after Decca's acquisition by PolyGram in 1980, this time as a twin boxed set. The recordings were distributed exclusively by EMI, which was somewhat ironic as EMI was Decca's main competitor for several decades.  In addition to the 'new' Argo logo, the EMI logo was displayed on the spine of the case sleeve.

The sleeve artwork was a heavily cropped portion of the illustration from the earlier compilation.  The picture was based on one from the original books, the artist being credited as "Quick on the Draw".  Decca was shown as copyright holder; Kaye & Ward Ltd and Third Man Music were no longer mentioned in the sleeve notes

First release:
The Railway Stories - ARGO - SAY 87/1 - two mono cassettes - (date unknown)
 Narrator: Johnny Morris
Side 1 - The Three Railway Engines
Side 2 - Thomas the Tank Engine
Side 3 - James the Red Engine:
Side 4 - Tank Engine Thomas Again

These tapes were marked as 'a Delesé Production.The Railway Stories - ARGO - SAY 29 - two stereo cassettes - (1982) Narrator: William Rushton
 Tape content is the same as for the 'second release' tapes.

The cassette label and case insert showed the title as "The Railway Stories", and named the narrator and original author. Apart from this, and the usual copyright data, they were completely devoid of any indication as to the content of the recordings or the people behind them. It is not known whether the cassettes were originally supplied in some form of additional outer case that better described their content.

Second release:The Railway Stories - ARGO 1058 - Double stereo cassette - (1982) Narrator: William RushtonSides One & Two – (tape 1 - individually labelled ARGO 1059): 
 Book 9: Edward the Blue Engine
 Book 10: Four Little Engines
 Book 11: Percy the Small EngineSides Three & Four – (tape 2 - individually labelled ARGO 1060): 
 Book 12: The Eight Famous Engines
 Book 13: Duck and the Diesel Engine
 Book 14: The Little Old EngineMore Railway Stories - ARGO xxxx - Double stereo cassette - (1983) Narrator: William RushtonSides One & Two – (tape 1 - individually labelled ARGO xxxx): 
 Book 15: The Twin Engines
 Book 16: Branch Line Engines
 Book 17: Gallant Old EngineSides Three & Four – (tape 2 - individually labelled ARGO xxxx): 
 Book 18: Stepney the "Bluebell" Engine
 Book 19: Mountain Engines
 Book 20: Very Old EnginesFurther Railway Stories - ARGO xxxx - Double stereo cassette - (1984) Narrator: William Rushton
 Cover picture: Henry, from "Super Rescue"Sides One & Two – (tape 1 - individually labelled ARGO xxxx): 
 Book 21: Main Line Engines
 Book 22: Small Railway Engines
 Book 23: Enterprising EnginesSides Three & Four – (tape 2 - individually labelled ARGO xxxx): 
 Book 24: Oliver the Western Engine
 Book 25: Duke the Lost Engine
 Book 26: Tramway Engines

Ted Robbins recordings
In association with Reed-Tempo Publishing, Ted Robbins recorded most of the stories written by Christopher Awdry.  These were released in the 1990s by Egmont Books, on a series of four audio cassettes. In each case, the 'middle' book was split across the two sides of the cassette:Thomas and the Twins, and other stories (1994)
 Book 33: Thomas and the Twins
 Book 32: Toby, Trucks and Trouble
 Book 30: More About Thomas the Tank EngineGordon the High Speed Engine, and other stories (1994)
 Book 31: Gordon the High Speed Engine
 Book 36: Thomas Comes Home
 Book 37: Henry and the ExpressReally Useful Engines, and other stories (1995)
 Book 27: Really Useful Engines
 Book 29: Great Little Engines
 Book 38: Wilbert the Forest EngineJames and the Diesel Engine, and other stories''' (1995)
 Book 28: James and the Diesel Engines Book 34: Jock the New Engine Book 35: Thomas and the Great Railway ShowA selection of the stories were later released for the Early Learning Centre, under the title Storytime with Thomas the Tank Engine: "10 classic railway stories with music and sound effects". There were two cassettes released, both using the same Ken Stott-style illustration, the second being labelled 'Volume 2'.

Michael Angelis recordings
The first new Railway Stories recording in over 10 years was released on CD by BBC Audiobooks in March 2006. It contained adaptations of the first three Railway Series books, and was narrated by Michael Angelis.  So far, six such CDs have been released, each containing three volumes from the Railway Series. 

The CDs are more reflective of the Thomas the Tank Engine and Friends'' TV series than the Railway Series books. This is evident through the cover art, which uses promotional images from the recent series', the storytelling style, and the splicing of several of the songs from the TV series within the stories. 

The first volume of The Railway Stories that Angelis narrated (consisting of The Three Railway Engines, Thomas the Tank Engine, and James the Red Engine) is available for download at the iTunes Store as well.

Angelis has also recorded a number of stories for the "Thomas & Friends Audio Range". Each book, which is of a similar form to those in the My Thomas Story Library range, is accompanied by a CD containing the story narrated by Angelis, with sound effects and music. Known subjects include: Thomas, Gordon, Henry, James, Toby, Bertie and Terence.

Other recordings
There have been other audiobooks containing stories from The Railway Series, although most of these are based on stories re-written for the Thomas and Friends TV series.

Translations
At least one set of stories has been released in Welsh (Tomos A'r Goeden Nadolig).

References

External links
 'Awdryania' - Description of the merchandise spawned from The Railway Series before the advent of the TV series.  Includes pictures of The Railway Stories vinyl singles and albums.
 '123Oldies' Johnny Morris Volumes 1 to 4 available on CD
 Profile of the narrators of the TV series and audio recordings

The Railway Series
Audiobooks by title or series